Once a Sinner is a 1931 American pre-Code romance film directed by Guthrie McClintic and written by George Middleton. The film stars Dorothy Mackaill, Joel McCrea, John Halliday, C. Henry Gordon, Ilka Chase and Sally Blane. The film was released on January 25, 1931, by Fox Film Corporation.

Cast        
Dorothy Mackaill as Diana Barry
Joel McCrea as Tommy Mason
John Halliday as Richard Kent
C. Henry Gordon as Serge Ratoff
Ilka Chase as Kitty King
Sally Blane as Hope Patterson
Nanette Faro as Marie 
Clara Blandick as Mrs. Mason
Myra Hampton as Mrs. Nolan
George Brent as James Brent

References

External links 
 

1931 films
Fox Film films
American romance films
1930s romance films
Films directed by Guthrie McClintic
American black-and-white films
1930s English-language films
1930s American films